For the 1998 Vuelta a España, the field consisted of 198 riders; 108 finished the race.

By rider

By nationality

References

1998 Vuelta a España
1998